Casuntingan may refer to any of the following places in the Philippines:

 Casuntingan, a barangay in the city of Mandaue
 Casuntingan, a barangay in the municipality of MacArthur, Leyte